Sirens Of Lesbos is a four piece band and music label based in Switzerland.

History 
Sirens Of Lesbos was formed in 2014 by Melvyn Buss and Arci Friede who collaborated as co-producers and musicians. They were joined by vocalist sisters Jasmina and Nabyla Serag who are also songwriters.

In 2018, Sirens Of Lesbos launched their  eponymous label with their new single titled,  We'll Be Fine. Their debut album,  SOL  was released in November 2020 featuring Atlanta rapper JID and London-based singer Theodor Black.

Aside from being their first album, SOL is  also an abbreviation of the band's name, Sirens Of Lesbos. The five members of  the band started their career in the 2010s with an Ibiza club hit written to their credit. Their music  has attracted  fans including BBC 1Xtra’s Jamz Supernova, BBC 6 Music’s Nemone, Worldwide FM’s Gilles Peterson and Beats 1’s Ebro Darden. Their sound and lyrics are the product of their mixed backgrounds and upbringings.

Discography

Notable Songs

References

External links

Musical groups established in 2000
Swiss musical groups